The Sounds Wrong EP is the second EP by Californian punk rock band Swingin' Utters, released in 1995.

Track listing

The EP's final track is in fact two separate songs, with Sounds Wrong finishing and Devious Means starting at 1:14.

Personnel
 Johnny "Peebucks" Bonnel (vocals) 
 Greg McEntee (drums) 
 Darius Koski (guitar) 
 Kevin Wickersham (bass) 
 Max Huber (guitar)

In other media 
"Stupid Lullabies" appears in Dave Mirra Freestyle BMX as part of an in-game soundtrack.

References

External links
 Swingin' Utters official discography
 "The Sounds Wrong EP" on Allmusic

Swingin' Utters albums
1995 EPs